Mirza Golband (also Romanized as Mīrzā Golband) is a village in Blukat Rural District, Rahmatabad and Blukat District, Rudbar County, Gilan Province, Iran. At the 2006 census, its population was 405, in 100 families.

References 

Populated places in Rudbar County